Euphorbia brachycera is a species of flowering plant in the Euphorbiaceae family. It is referred to by the common name horned spurge and is native to Northern Mexico and the Rocky Mountains of the US. It is a rhizomatous herbaceous perennial growing in spreading mats, with narrow green leaves and yellow flowerheads. It usually grows on calcareous soils.

References

brachycera
Flora of North America
Taxa described in 1858